Jamie's Super Food is a UK food lifestyle programme which was broadcast on Channel 4 in 2014.

Episodes

External links
 The TVDB.com

Channel 4 original programming
British cooking television shows
2014 British television series debuts
2014 British television series endings
English-language television shows